is a passenger railway station located in Minami-ku, Sakai, Osaka Prefecture, Japan, operated by the Semboku Rapid Railway. It is station number SB03.

Lines

Station layout
The station consists of one elevated island platform with the station building underneath.

Platforms

Adjacent stations

History
Izumigaoka Station opened on April 1, 1971.

Passenger statistics
In fiscal 2019, the station was used by an average of 40,504 passengers daily (boarding passengers only).

Surrounding area
 Senboku New Town residential area
 Sakai City Izumigaoka Civic Center
 Sakai City Minami Library
 Momoyama Gakuin College of Education
 Tezukayama Gakuin University
 Tezukayama Gakuin Izumigaoka Junior and Senior High School
 Osaka Prefectural Semboku High School
 Osaka Prefectural Sakai Higashi High School

See also
List of railway stations in Japan

References

External links

Semboku Rapid Railway official page

Railway stations in Japan opened in 1971
Railway stations in Osaka Prefecture
Sakai, Osaka